Trinervitermes is a termite genus belonging to family Termitidae. Members are native to the Old World. They inhabit grasslands and store grass in their nests or mounds, just below the ground surface. Their grass-collecting activities are mainly nocturnal. The soldier caste has atrophied mandibles and a fontanelle squirt gun on the frons. Diterpenes and monoterpenes are released to deter ants and smaller predators, but these are not effective against larger mammalian predators. Due to the snout on the head of soldiers and their grass-collecting habits, they are known as snouted harvester termites.

Species
Species include:
 Trinervitermes biformis (Wasmann, 1902) – India and Sri Lanka
 Trinervitermes dispar (Sjöstedt) – East Africa to South Africa
 Trinervitermes rapulum (Sjöstedt) – East Africa to southern Africa
 Trinervitermes rhodesiensis  (Sjöstedt) – East Africa to southern Africa
 Trinervitermes trinervoides (Sjöstedt, 1911) – South Africa, Namibia, Zimbabwe and Mozambique
 Trinervitermes rubidus (Hagen, 1859) – Sri Lanka

References

Termite genera
Insects of Africa
Insects of Asia